The 1950 California gubernatorial election was held on November 7, 1950. For the last time, Warren was reelected governor in a landslide over the Democratic opponent, James Roosevelt, the son of President Franklin D. Roosevelt.

Warren is the last Republican gubernatorial nominee to have won Alameda County, along with being the last nominee of any party to sweep every county in the state.

General Election Results

References

Gubernatorial
California
1950
November 1950 events in the United States